Grevillea erythroclada, commonly called needle-leaf grevillea, is a species of flowering plant in the family Proteaceae and is endemic to northern Australia. It is a shrub or small tree with divided leaves, the ultimate lobes linear to more or less cylindrical, and clusters of cream-coloured to pale yellow flowers.

Description
The leaves are more or less glabrous and deeply wrinkled.

Taxonomy
Grevillea erythroclada was first formally described in 1918 by William Vincent Fitzgerald in Journal and Proceedings of the Royal Society of Western Australia from specimens he collected near the Upper Isdell and Hann Rivers. The specific epithet (erythroclada) means "a red young shoot".

Distribution and habitat
Needle-leaf grevillea grows in open woodland, often near watercourses, in scattered locations in the Central Kimberley, Great Sandy Desert, Northern Kimberley and Victoria Bonaparte bioregions of northern Western Australia, in the north of the Northern Territory, and on Cape York Peninsula in Queensland.

Conservation status
This grevillea is listed as "not threatened" by the Western Australian Department of Biodiversity, Conservation and Attractions, and as of "least concern" under the Territory Parks and Wildlife Conservation Act and the Queensland Government Nature Conservation Act 1992.

See also
 List of Grevillea species

References

erythroclada
Endemic flora of Western Australia
Eudicots of Western Australia
Proteales of Australia
Taxa named by William Vincent Fitzgerald